Lloyd Corners is an unincorporated community in Licking County, Ohio, United States.

References

Unincorporated communities in Licking County, Ohio
Unincorporated communities in Ohio